Abdikadir Yahya Ali (1957 – July 12, 2005), was a Somali peace activist best known for his work through his own Centre for Research and Dialogue. Yahya also worked from time to time as an independent consultant giving advice and administrative support to international Crisis Group. He had devoted many years to foster peace and reconciliation in Somalia and was widely respected by his people and by many in the international community.

Abdikadir Yahya Ali hails from Abdalla Sabdi sub-clan of Murusade, a branch of the main Hawiye clan.

Death
On July 12, 2005, around 2 a.m., he was killed at his house. A group of roughly 10 assassins, wearing masks or scarves around their faces, used a ladder to scale the back wall of Yahya's compound. To find their way in the dark, they had flashlights tied to the barrels of their Kalashnikovs. Yahye guards, some of them sleeping, were taken by surprise and handcuffed. The killers entered the house, which apparently was unlocked. Some of the men made their way to a second-floor bedroom and woke Yahya and his wife. They demanded valuables and took Yahye's laptop. Then they led Yahya to a corridor where they executed him. First, they shot him several times with an AK-47, then two or three more times to the mouth and head with a pistol. The Al-qaeda linked Shabaab group was alleged the killing of Yahya.

See also
 Abdalla Sabdi
List of peace activists

References

1957 births
2005 deaths
Somalian murder victims
Somalian activists
Somalian Muslims
Assassinated activists